Vitela is a surname. Notable people with this surname include:
Alma Marina Vitela (born 1965), Mexican nurse and politician, a member of the Morena party
Rodolfo Vitela (born 1949), Mexican former cyclist
Surnames of Mexican origin

Spanish-language surnames